Gretl Weikert (born 25 September 1914, date of death unknown) was an Austrian alpine skier. She competed in the FIS Alpine World Ski Championships 1936, where she won bronze in slalom. She also competed in the women's combined event at the Winter Olympics the same year.

References

1914 births
Year of death missing
Austrian female alpine skiers
Olympic alpine skiers of Austria
Alpine skiers at the 1936 Winter Olympics
Skiers from Budapest
20th-century Austrian women
21st-century Austrian women